Salamis cacta, the lilac mother-of-pearl or lilac beauty, is a butterfly in the family Nymphalidae. It is found in Senegal, Guinea, Sierra Leone, Liberia, Ivory Coast, Ghana, Togo, Benin, Nigeria, Cameroon, Equatorial Guinea, Gabon, the Republic of Congo, the Central African Republic, Angola, the Democratic Republic of Congo, Uganda, Rwanda, Ethiopia, Kenya, Tanzania, Malawi, Mozambique and Zimbabwe. The habitat consists of forests, including disturbed forest habitats.

Adults usually fly in the forest canopy, but may descend to suck at damp patches or to settle in the undergrowth. Occasionally, individuals may join migrations of other species. Adults are on wing year round.

The larvae feed on Urera hypselodendron, Urera trinervis, and Urera occidentalis.

Subspecies
Salamis cacta cacta — south-eastern Senegal, Guinea, Sierra Leone, Liberia, Ivory Coast, Ghana, Togo, Benin, Nigeria, Cameroon, Equatorial Guinea, Gabon, Congo, Central African Republic, Angola, Democratic Republic of Congo, Uganda, Rwanda, Ethiopia, western Kenya, Tanzania 
Salamis cacta amaniensis Vosseler, 1907 — coast of Kenya, north-eastern Tanzania
Salamis cacta eileenae Henning & Joannou, 1994 — Malawi, west-central Mozambique, eastern Zimbabwe

References

Butterflies described in 1793
Junoniini
Taxa named by Johan Christian Fabricius